The Sun City Agreement was an agreement that was signed between some of the warring parties in the Second Congo War on 2 April 2003 at the luxury South African casino resort of Sun City, as a result of the Inter-Congolese dialogue (ICD). Delegates hoped that this would be a historic "final act", ending more than four years of war and setting up a government of national unity.

The agreement was witnessed by South African President Thabo Mbeki as well as the heads of state of Botswana, Namibia, Zambia and Zimbabwe. In his speech during the meeting, Mbeki praised the delegates who had spent 19 months involved in the ICD negotiations.

Participants
The partial agreement was reached between the government, the Ugandan-backed Mouvement de liberation du Congo (MLC) armed opposition group and a majority of civil society and unarmed political opposition groups. Unfortunately, the parties were not able to establish a new constitution and government, despite repeated attempts.

However, another armed opposition movement, the Rassemblement congolais pour la democratie (RCD-Goma), backed by Rwanda, along with several parties of the unarmed political opposition including the Union pour la Democratie et le Progres Social (UDPS) of the veteran Congolese politician and former prime minister, Etienne Tshisekedi refused to sign the accord, which led to concerns about a return to violence.

Treaty terms
The agreement laid down a framework for providing the Congo with a unified, multi-party government and a timeline for democratic elections.

Among other stipulations, the agreement allowed Joseph Kabila to remain president of the Democratic Republic of the Congo during a transition period of two years, extendable to three, with Jean-Pierre Bemba (the leader of the MLC) serving as prime minister in a transitional government.

It was further stipulated that Kabila would share power with four vice-presidents - one from each of the two main armed opposition movements, one from the government and one from the unarmed political opposition. Ministries would be divided up and former opposition fighters would be integrated into the army and police.

After the conclusion of the accord, critics noted that there were no stipulations regarding the unification of the army, which weakened the effectiveness of the agreement. There were several reported breaches of the agreement, but initially it resulted in a reduction in the fighting.

There was also criticism that the delegates were not provided with a complete dossier of documentation at the end of the agreement (such as minutes of meetings, commission reports and resolutions), which hindered informed debate in the Congo. It was also felt that the principles which guided the formation of the follow-up organs of the Sun City Agreement were not clear.

The Sun City Agreement did not stop the conflict, as shown by subsequent events (see Second Congo War).

External links 
 Inter-Congolese Negotiations: The Final Act (Sun City Agreement) UN Peacemaker Database

History of the Democratic Republic of the Congo
Politics of the Democratic Republic of the Congo
2002 in the Democratic Republic of the Congo
Treaties concluded in 2002
Treaties of the Democratic Republic of the Congo
Moses Kotane Local Municipality
Second Congo War